Vijali Ghar, also known as Electricity House, is an office building on Relief Road, Ahmedabad, Gujarat, India. It is an Art Deco building designed by Claude Batley.

History 
The building was a headquarter of the Ahmedabad Electricity Company (AEC). It houses Torrent Power office which distributes electricity in the city.

Architecture
Vijali Ghar is an Art Deco building designed by Claude Batley. The plain façade of the building is follows the curve of the road highlighted by horizontal lines. The main block is separated from the attic by a concrete chhajja. It was built with reinforced concrete. It also used tubular pipes for rails.

Gallery

See also
 Ahmedabad Town Hall
 M. J. Library
 Tagore Memorial Hall

References

Buildings and structures in Ahmedabad
British colonial architecture in India
Art Deco architecture in India
Buildings and structures completed in the 20th century